The Aerial Navigation Act 1911, passed by British Government, was a statute that conferred power to Parliament to close airspace over Britain including the English Channel, from foreign aircraft, when felt necessary. It was motivated by the perceived need to protect British citizens from aircraft incidents, following Louis Blériot's flight across the English Channel in 1909 and the Paris Convention of 1910.

See also
 International Air Navigation Conference

References

External links 
 "United Kingdom Aerial Navigation Act, 1911", Winston Churchill (1911)

United Kingdom Acts of Parliament 1911
Aviation history of the United Kingdom
History of transport in the United Kingdom